EMILE is the Early Mac Image LoadEr, a bootloader for loading Linux on Macintosh computers that have m68k processors. It was written by Laurent Vivier, and is meant to eventually replace the Penguin booter that is more usually in use.

In contrast to the Penguin booter, which requires a working classic Mac OS installation, EMILE modifies the boot block on a hard disk to boot Linux directly.

External links 
 EMILE, site SourceForge

Free boot loaders